Abdul Latif Daeng Masikki was the first regent of Poso Regency, Central Sulawesi, Indonesia; who ruled from 1952 to 1954. As the first regent of Poso, he was also the first regent derived from the military.

He was succeeded by Alimuddin Daeng Matiro.

References

Indonesian politicians
Indonesian military personnel
People from Central Sulawesi
Regents of places in Indonesia